The 2006 Savannah State Tigers football team represented Savannah State University in American football. The Tigers were members of the NCAA Division I Football Championship Subdivision

Schedule

Preseason
 Athletic director Sterling Steward Jr. announced the hiring of new head coach  Theo Lemon 
15 players signed letters of intent to attend Savannah State University on February 3, 2006.

Coaches and support staff

Roster

Quarterbacks
3 Jacorey Kilcrease – freshman
14 Brandon Dozier – Junior
6 Garrett Williams – sophomore
18 Daniel White – Freshman

Running backs
1 Quinton Beasley – Senior
32 Louis Bacon – Sophomore
22 Antwon Edwards – Freshman
31 Charles Howard – Junior
44 Craig Chambers – Sophomore
28 Reginald May – sophomore
48 Jerry Stinson – Sophomore
 21 Stephen Williams – Freshman

Wide receivers
3 Solomon Agyei – Junior
7 Bernard Coleman – sophomore
17 Tyson Kirkland – sophomore
15 Isaiah Cruz – Freshman
5 Del Ben – Freshman
89 Anthony Bowden senior
86 David Roberson "Junior"
80 Derek Harkness– Junior
9 Deleon Hollinger – Senior
29 Amondo Harris – freshman
20 Llich Solano – sophomore

Tight ends
88 Joshua Marshall – Freshman
85 Terrence Kirkland – Junior
84 Marcus Harris – senior

Kickers / Punters
14 Luis Justiniano – freshman (K)
49 Jeremy Johnson – Junior (P)

Offensive line
73 Byron Allen – senior
75 James Arowoselu– Senior
59 Derrick Dorsey – freshman
66  Rashad Jackson – Junior
71 Kereem Riley – sophomore
70 Peter Booker – Sophomore
64 Justin Norton – sophomore
73 Tim Moss – Freshman
79 Louis Hall – freshman
67 Austin Davis  – sophomore
65 Warren Washington – sophomore
66 Algernon Wright – freshman

Defensive line
55 Dominque Clark – Junior
93 Brandon Miller – freshman
90 Mike slaughter – Sophomore
99 Lee Riley – senior
48 Chris Browlson – Sophomore
57  Horton Louima– freshman
92 Randy Harling – Junior
91 Chris Reed– freshman
94 Chris Osborne – Junior	
95 Tony Newman – sophomore
69 Randy Williams – Junior
87 Fred Wright – freshman

Linebackers
56 Jonathan Stewart – Junior
13 Brandon Luster – freshman
40 Dominque Wells – sophomore
41 Timothy Gregory – senior
93 Jalvin Lovett – Junior
44 Trent Newman – senior
16 Brandon Parker– sophomore
10 Josh Mitchell – sophomore
51 Calvin Leonard – Sophomore
45 DeAngelo Jenkins – freshman

Defensive backs
11 Larrione Carlyle – senior
26 Antwan Allen – freshman
19 Jeremy Boston – sophomore
13 Jonathan Johnson – freshman
15 Chris Herans – sophomore
49 Ryan Carmichael – sophomore
37 Nate Carr– Junior
29 Brandon Howard– sophomore
8 Steven Drinks – Freshman
43 Chester McBride – Junior
12 Frank Usher  – sophomore

Media
Radio flagship: WHCJ
Broadcasters: Steve Richards (play-by-play), Curtis Foster (analyst)

Statistics
Current as of  – All Games

Team

Scores by quarter

Individual offense

Rushing

Passing

Receiving

Defense

Special teams

References

Savannah State
Savannah State Tigers football seasons
Savannah State Tigers football